Ed Roberson (born 1939) is an American poet.

Life
Roberson was born and raised in Pittsburgh and graduated from the University of Pittsburgh in 1970, and later completed graduate work at Goddard College.  
He then served as a faculty member in the Department of English at the University of Pittsburgh and at Rutgers University until 2002.  He married Rhonda Wiles in May 1973 who graduated from Rutgers University Douglas College and Hofstra Law School in New York. They have one child together, a daughter, Lena Illininiza Roberson, in 1976.

Since 2007, he has been a visiting writer and artist in Residence at the Northwestern University School of Professional Studies and has also taught at the University of Chicago and Columbia College. He is Artist-in-Residence at Northwestern University.

His work appears in the literary magazine Callaloo. Roberson has written eleven books of poetry.

Awards
 2020 Jackson Poetry Prize from Poets & Writers
 2017 Academy of American Poets Fellowship
 2016 PEN/Voelcker Award for Poetry
 2008 Shelley Memorial Award
 1998 National Poetry Series, for Atmosphere Conditions chosen by Nathaniel Mackey
 Iowa Poetry Prize for Voices Cast Out to Talk Us In
 LA Times Book Award
 Stephen Henderson Critics Award for Achievement in Literature
 Lila Wallace-Reader's Digest Writers' Award
 Lenore Marshall Award finalist, Academy of American Poets’

Works

Poetry
 
 "From: Picking Up the Tune, the Universe and Planets", Electronic Poetry Center
 "VI. Cape Journal: At Sand Pile", Electronic Poetry Center

Anthologies

References

External links
 "Ed Roberson", Poetry Lectures, Poetry Foundation
 Ed Roberson: Poems and Profile at Poets.org

1939 births
Living people
University of Pittsburgh alumni
University of Pittsburgh faculty
Rutgers University faculty
Northwestern University faculty
American male poets
20th-century American poets
20th-century American male writers
21st-century American poets
21st-century American male writers
African-American poets
African-American male writers